The Fubon Sky Tree is a residential skyscraper in West District, Taichung, Taiwan. Construction of the building began in 2013 and it was completed in 2016. The building was designed by the Japanese architect Toyo Ito.

Design 
The exterior design comes with stone walls, glass façades and double-layered exterior walls, which have both energy-saving effects, and the irregularities of the house body stand out to symbolize the branches of a large tree. The terraces of special households are like a "canopy", adding to the overall bionic sense of the building.
The first floor of the entrance hall has a height of 6 meters. The interior design combines simplistic styles resembling nature, such as trees, flowers, and ripples. One can see the outdoor garden green from the large glass windows of the lobby, and the public facilities, which include a swimming pool, a banquet hall, etc. are located on the 38th and 39th floors in order to enable the residences to enjoy the skyline of Taichung at night.

See also 
 List of tallest buildings in Asia
 List of tallest buildings in Taiwan
 List of tallest buildings in Taichung
 La Bella Vita (skyscraper)

References

Fubon Sky Tree on Taiwan Architect Website (in Chinese) 

2016 establishments in Taiwan
Residential skyscrapers in Taiwan
Skyscrapers in Taichung
Apartment buildings in Taiwan